St. Luke's Episcopal Church is a historic Episcopal church in Fine Creek Mills, Virginia, United States. It was built in 1843–1844, and is a one-story, Classical Revival style brick church building.  It measures 20 feet wide by 36 feet deep, and features a pedimented front gable roof.

It was added to the National Register of Historic Places in 1989.

References

19th-century Episcopal church buildings
Buildings and structures in Powhatan County, Virginia
Churches completed in 1844
Episcopal churches in Virginia
National Register of Historic Places in Powhatan County, Virginia
Neoclassical architecture in Virginia
Churches on the National Register of Historic Places in Virginia
Neoclassical church buildings in the United States